Pueblo Nuevo (Spanish: "New Town") may refer to:

Places
Chile
Pueblo Nuevo, Temuco

Colombia
Pueblo Nuevo, Córdoba

Cuba
Pueblo Nuevo, Havana, ward in Centro Habana
Pueblo Nuevo, Matanzas
Pueblo Nuevo, Cienfuegos
Pueblo Nuevo, Pinar del Río
Pueblo Nuevo, Holguín

Dominican Republic
Pueblo Nuevo, santiago de los caballeros

Guatemala
Pueblo Nuevo, Suchitepéquez

Mexico
Pueblo Nuevo, Durango
Pueblo Nuevo Municipality, Durango
Pueblo Nuevo, Jalisco, near Barranca de Otates
Pueblo Nuevo Solistahuacán, Chiapas

Nicaragua
Pueblo Nuevo, Estelí

Panama
Pueblo Nuevo, Panama
Pueblo Nuevo metro station

Peru
Pueblo Nuevo District, Chincha
Pueblo Nuevo District, Chepén
Pueblo Nuevo, Chepén, a town in Chepén Province
Pueblo Nuevo District, Ferreñafe
Pueblo Nuevo District, Ica

Spain
Pueblo Nuevo, Madrid
Pueblo Nuevo (Madrid Metro), a metro station connecting lines 5 and 7
Pueblonuevo del Guadiana (or Pueblonuevo), a town in Extremadura

Venezuela
, municipal seat of Falcón Municipality, Falcón
Pueblo Nuevo, Zulia, municipal seat of Francisco Javier Pulgar Municipality, Zulia

Music
"Pueblo Nuevo" (danzón), composition by Israel López "Cachao"
"Pueblo Nuevo se pasó", composition by Lilí Martínez

See also
Pueblo Viejo (disambiguation)